The Bop Won't Stop is an album by Welsh rock and roll singer Shakin' Stevens, released in November 1983 by Epic Records. Compared to his previous albums, this album was not as successful, only peaking at number 21 on the UK Albums Chart despite the success of its singles.

Release
The album spawned three UK Top-5 singles: "Cry Just a Little Bit", "A Rockin' Good Way" (a duet with Bonnie Tyler) and "A Love Worth Waiting For". A cover of Ricky Nelson's "It's Late" was also released, peaking at number 11 in the UK. In Mexico, a cover of Jerry Williams & Roadwork's "Diddle I" was released as a single in 1983, with the B-side "Love Me Tonight".

In the US and Canada, like with Stevens' previous album Give Me Your Heart Tonight, The Bop Won't Stop was released with only 10 tracks, omitting "Livin' Lovin' Wreck" and "It's Late".

The album became Stevens' first CD release in 1984. In 2009, it was re-released on CD as part of The Epic Masters box set, which included bonus tracks. The bonus tracks were two B-sides and two singles: a cover of "Your Ma Said You Cried in Your Sleep Last Night", which was only released in Europe, and also a cover of "A Letter to You" which was released as a single from Stevens' Greatest Hits album.

Reception
Reviewing the album for Number One, James McGregor gave the album a four out of five and wrote "Honour where honours due. Somehow Shaky's put all the pieces together and turned rockabilly and '50s crooning into an '80s mix that anybody can enjoy. His latest offering is a perfect lightweight performance, undoctored, urgent, and just the right side of tongue in cheek."

Reviewing for Smash Hits, Linda Duff gave the album four out of ten, describing it as "Nothing new or even remotely startling. Shaky rattles out the same old song – literally, even his self-penned tracks are ripped off from his own previous hits."

Track listing

2009 bonus tracks:

Personnel
Shaky's musicians
 Shakin' Stevens – vocals
 Les Davidson – lead guitar
 Roger McKew – lead and rhythm guitar
 Dick Bland – bass guitar
 Gavin Povey – piano, synthesiser
 Chris Wyles – drums
 The Rumour Brass:
 Ray Beavis – tenor saxophone
 John "Irish" Earle – baritone and tenor saxophones
 Chris Gower – trombone
 Dick Hanson – trumpet

Technical
 Neill King – engineer
 Simon Hurrell – engineer
 Christopher Neil – producer (all except 3, 7, 10)
 Richard Anthony Hewson – producer (10)
 Shakin' Stevens – producer (3, 7, 10)
 Simon Cantwell – art direction
 Alan Ballard – photography

Charts

Certifications and sales

References

1983 albums
Shakin' Stevens albums
albums produced by Christopher Neil
Epic Records albums